Onegesius was a powerful Hunnic logades (minister) who supposedly held power second only to Attila the Hun. According to Priscus he "seated on a chair to the right of the king" i.e. Attila.

History
Priscus, who was on a mission to Attila in 448 or 449 AD, says that Onegesius lived in the same very populous village Attila resided. He recounts: 

According to Onegesius's order Priscus and Maximinus were greeted by his wife at his compound. That the honour and respect of his supporters were important to Attila is shown from Priscus testimony: 

Priscus recounts a rare story of a Greek he encountered in the village, and who managed to get freedom from the Huns, but decided to live among them: 

Onegesius and his brother Skottas were persons of special interest to the Romans in their failed plot to assassinate Attila in 448 or 449 AD, which included Chrysaphius and Hun Edeco, but Onegesius was most of the time away. Priscus recounts "Since Onegesius was away, I said, he [Skottas] needed to support us, and more his brother, in pursuit of this good business. I said we knew Attila followed his guidance too, but we would not firmly believe the reports about him unless we came to know his power through experience. He replied that no one any longer doubted Attila deemed his words and deeds equal to his brother's. And he immediately mounted his horse and rode to Attila's tent".

The barbarians acted cleverly and "awaited Onegesios's return in order to deliver the gifts we ourselves wanted to give and those the emperor sent". Onegesios "along with the eldest (probably Ellac) of Attila's children, had been sent to the Akateri, a Scythian people, whom he was bringing into an alliance with Attila". As the Akatziroi tribes and clans were ruled by different leaders, emperor Theodosius II tried with gifts to spread animosity among them, but the gifts were not delivered according to rank, Kouridachos, warned and called Attila against fellow leaders. So Attila did, Kardach stayed with his tribe or clan in own territory, while the rest of the Akatziroi became subjected to Attila. He "desired to make his eldest son their king, and so sent Onegesios to do it".

Maximinus, not knowing that the plot failed, tried to bribe Onegesius, "that the time has come for Onegesios to have greater fame among men, if he would go to the emperor, use his intelligence to understand their disputes and establish harmony between the Romans and the Huns. It would, he said, not only be thenceforward advantageous to both nations but it would also provide many benefits for his own house: he himself and his children would forever be friends of the emperor and his descendants". It was supposed to be done by crossing into Roman territory, establishing relations with the emperor, studying and resolving the causes of the disputes. Onegesius responded: 

In the end he composed along his secretaries and Roustikios the letter according to Attila's will which has been delivered to the emperor. He also released the wife of certain Sullos for 500 gold coins, and his children sent as a gift to the emperor. They were captured in the fall of Ratiaria.

Etymology
The same name may be attested in the Vita Sancti Lupi as Hunigasius. Otto J. Maenchen-Helfen and Omeljan Pritsak both considered the endings -os/us or -ios/ius to be a Greek addition to the name.

Maenchen-Helfen considered the name to be of East Germanic origin, reconstructing it as Hunigis, a name attested elsewhere. He argues that the first element, hun-, most likely means either "cub of a bear, young man" or "high".

Omeljan Pritsak derived Onegesi / Hunigasi from roots akin to Mongolian *ünen (truth) and the Oghuz Turkic suffix  gās-i. The reconstructed form is actually an epithet *üne-gāsi (honest, faithful, truthful, loyal), which was shown by Onegesius in his loyal behaviour toward Attila.

Others have suggested Turkic etymologies. L. Rásonyi derived the name from Turkic oneki (twelve), an etymology that Maenchen-Helfen rejects. F. Altheim and R. Stiehl derived it from Turkic on-iyiz, meaning "he who commands ten", a reference to the steppe system of organizing command in groups of ten.

References

Sources
 
 
 
 
 
 

Huns
Attila the Hun